is a passenger railway station located in the city of Shiki, Saitama, Japan, operated by the private railway operator Tōbu Railway.

Lines
Located between Shiki and Mizuhodai stations, it is 19.3 km from the Ikebukuro terminus. Only Semi express and Local services stop at this station.

Station layout

The station consists of a single elevated island platform serving two tracks, with the station building located underneath.

Platforms

History
The station opened on 8 November 1979.

Through-running to and from  via the Tokyo Metro Fukutoshin Line commenced on 14 June 2008.

From 17 March 2012, station numbering was introduced on the Tobu Tojo Line, with Yanasegawa Station becoming "TJ-15".

Passenger statistics
In fiscal 2019, the station was used by an average of 20,264 passengers daily.

Accidents
On 3 September 2012 at around 22:10, a woman in her fifties jumped from the platform into the path of a non-stop Ikebukuro-bound express service and was killed.

Surrounding area
 Shiki New Town
 Yanasegawa River
 Atomi University

See also
 List of railway stations in Japan

References

External links

 Tobu station information 

Tobu Tojo Main Line
Stations of Tobu Railway
Railway stations in Saitama Prefecture
Railway stations in Japan opened in 1979
Shiki, Saitama